The United States ambassador to Nauru is the official representative of the government of the United States to the government of Nauru. The ambassador is concurrently the ambassador to Fiji, Kiribati, Tonga, and Tuvalu, while residing in Suva, Fiji.

Ambassadors

See also
Nauru – United States relations
Foreign relations of Nauru
Ambassadors of the United States

References

United States Department of State: Background notes on Nauru

External links
 United States Department of State: Chiefs of Mission for Nauru
 United States Department of State: Nauru
United States Embassy in Suva

 
Nauru
United States